École Franco-Nord is a French-language elementary school located in Prince George, British Columbia, Canada.  The school's name is a reference to the northern geographic location of Prince George within British Columbia (nord translates to north).

External links
 French-language school board for British Columbia
 Franco-Nord, school web site

Elementary schools in Prince George, British Columbia
French-language schools in British Columbia
Educational institutions in Canada with year of establishment missing